Olympia Fields is a station on Metra's Metra Electric Line located in Olympia Fields, Illinois. The station is located on 203rd Street two blocks east of Kedzie Avenue and is adjacent to the Olympia Fields Country Club.

The station is on a solid-fill elevated structure and consists of one island platform which serves the Metra Electric Line's two tracks. The right-of-way also carries three Amtrak lines, the City of New Orleans, Illini and Saluki. None of the Amtrak trains stop here. Although the tracks are on an elevated fill, it is only high enough for a pedestrian underpass to the Olympia Fields Country Club. 203rd Street is a dead end street at the station. There is no ticket agent at Olympia Fields, but tickets may be purchased from a vending machine in the waiting room.

References

External links

entrance from Google Maps Street View

Metra stations in Illinois
Former Illinois Central Railroad stations
Railway stations in Cook County, Illinois
Railway stations in the United States opened in 1856